Al-Asman  is a Syrian hamlet located in the Karnaz Subdistrict of the Mahardah District in Hama Governorate. According to the Syria Central Bureau of Statistics (CBS), al-Asman had a population of 57 in the 2004 census.

References 

Populated places in Mahardah District